Khamgaon is a city in Buldhana District, Maharashtra, India. It is the largest city in Buldhana district. It is well connected to all other big cities of Maharashtra and  India through National Highway 6 and other state highways. Khamgaon Terminal has a single platform which goes to Jalamb junction only. The city needs express connectivity, so Indian Railways has decided to give halt to some express trains at Jalamb Junction so people can travel accordingly. The city has a big market as well. The city imports and exports many goods. Freight trains depart from and arrive in the city daily.

Khamgaon is known for being one of the hottest cities in Maharashtra with temperature often hitting 47–48 degrees Celsius during summer. Also, the rainfall is pretty low in the region which has led to water scarcity many times in the city over the past.

Khamgaon is often called "Silver City" because it has a renowned silver market, with pure form of silver products available. Amitabh Bachchan had ordered a silver statue of Ganesh from Khamgaon. Along with silver, there is a vibrant gold market and a number of goldsmiths in the city. It has previously been known as "Cotton City" when it was a major trade center for cotton during the British Raj.  The city is a major silver and cotton textile production center. After 1960, Maharashtra Industrial Development Corporation (MIDC) began acquiring land and setting up industrial estates in surrounding the city, which were quickly purchased by MNC's. Major industries in Khamgaon are FMCG, manufacturing, biotechnology, pharmaceuticals and automobiles etc.

It is an important educational hub in the district. There are many primary, secondary, higher secondary schools in the town. The city is well equipped with facilities for higher education including arts, science, commerce, law, medical, polytechnic and engineering. The Dnyanganga Wildlife Sanctuary is  situated a mere 20  km from the town. There are many animals and about 150 species of birds there.

Khamgaon is an education hub with many Schools and Colleges such as Homeopathic Medical College, Siddhivinayak Technical Campus and Government Polytechnic Institution.

It also has Secondary and Higher Secondary Schools.
Medical Facility in Khamgaon quite stable with affordable Critical health care hospitals .

History

Khamgaon used to be a major cotton hub during the British era and has many old buildings from the British era. Mahatma Gandhi stayed here for a brief time during indian freedom movement, they also inaugurated Tilak Rashriya Vidyapeeth in the city. Khamgaon was a center for Swadeshi movement after Calcutta.

Dharma Baskar Sant Pachalegaonkar Maharaj Math is situated in Khamgaon. Nirgun Paduka of Dattatreya is believed to have been given to Pachalegaonkar Maharaj and is worshipped there by devotees.

The cotton trade at Khamgaon dates from about the year 1820, when a few merchants opened shops and began to trade in ghee, raw thread and a little cotton. The place is said to owe its start in commercial life to the good management of one Jetal Khan, a revenue collector, who invited and encouraged traders. But the settlement of capitalists here is ascribed to a characteristic accident. The great camps of Pendharis were followed by many merchants and brokers who made big gains by buying up the booty. In 1818 Colonel Doveton broke up a large horde of Pendharis at a village close to Khamgaon. They were forced to disband and scatter, so the honest prize agents of this camp settled at Khamgaon and their descendants became virtuous dealers of cotton in particular and other merchandise in general. In 1870. the town was said to be the largest cotton mart in India. However, it is no longer the case though the town still has a considerable trade in cotton. There are 22 ginning and pressing factories in the town. The weekly market is held on Thursdays and is very largely attended during the busy season. It is also a cattle market. A regulated market is also established in the town.

The general appearance of the town is picturesque. It is surrounded by low irregular hills, while in the hollow, in and about the town, trees are plentiful. Besides the courts of the Assistant and the Additional Sessions Judge and those of the Civil Judge (Senior Division) and Civil Judge (Junior Division), there are the offices of the Sub-Divisional Officer, Tahsildar and Panchayat Samiti. There is also a post and telegraph office. There are two hospitals in the town, one managed by the Government and the other managed by a private institution aided by the Government. The educational facilities are provided, by a number of primary schools and by seven high schools, viz., the Government Multipurpose High School, the Municipal High School, the New Era High School, the National High School, the Kela High School, the Anjuman Madhya Pradesh High School and the Government Girls' School. The G. S. College also provides facilities for higher education. There arc two police stations. The municipal office was situated in a club building many years ago. It has now been shifted to its new premises.

The town proper is split in two by a large nallah which runs from east to west. To cross it, there is a large bridge on the Chikhli Road as also a large causeway in the heart of the town which has grown on all sides. There was a large fort, a gadhi, which is no more in existence. Near the place where the gadhi was located, is a large vesa or gateway which clearly belonged to the fortifications of the former village. There are a temple of Maruti which is possibly of some antiquity, a handsome temple of Balaji, two fine Jain temples, a few lesser temples and four small mosques. The Mukteshvara Ashrama is conducted by the Bharatiya Samartha Dharma Rashtra Dharma Pracharak Mission which has a few branches in Bombay and some other places in the State.

Festivals

In Khamgaon, Ganesh Puja is celebrated on a large scale. Along with this, Diwali, Holi, Cheti Chand, Eid Baba Mastan Urs, And Syed Thikri Shah Miya Urs, Near Syed Baada (Traditional House of Syed) Mastan chowk, Dashera, Dr. Babasaheb Ambedkar Jayanti, Chhatrapati Shivaji Maharaj Jayanti, Mahavir jayanti, Kawad Yatra, and Ram Navmi are the major festivals of the City.
Ganesh Utsav of Khamgaon is very unique, near about 30 mandals in sequence take part in a procession along traditional path. Mothi Devi utsav is the unique festival celebrate in this City.

Climate

Arvind Agashe Kaka 
Khamgaon is also known as the place of Shri Arvind Agashe, commonly known as Kaka Mauli. He was one of the spiritual gurus from Datta Sampradaya. His memorial Barsana is at Amrit Nagar, Jalamb Road of Khamgaon.

Transport 

Khamgaon is well connected by National Highway 6 (NH 6) and Central Railway's Mumbai–Kolkata railway line. The city is served by the Khamgaon railway station, which was built during the British Raj. A Khamgaon–Jalna Railway line was approved by the Railway Minister in 2016.

Khamgoan Terminus railways station which runs a local train between Khamgaon to Jalamb there is a special direct train from Khamgaon to Pandharpur during Aashadhi Ekadashi wari the nearest railway stations are Malkapur, Jalamb Junction, Shegaon and Akola Junction, from which connections can be made to the broader rail network.

Demographics
 India census, Khamgaon had a population of 94,191. Males constituted 51.4% of the population and females 48.6%. Khamgaon had an average literacy rate of 92%, higher than the national average of 59.5%. Male literacy was 81%, and female literacy was 71%. 15% of the population was under 6 years of age. The main language spoken in Khamgaon is Marathi with hint of varhadi dialect.

References 

Cities and towns in Buldhana district